Stathmopoda plumbiflua is a moth of the family Stathmopodidae. It was described by Edward Meyrick in 1911 and is found in New Zealand.

References

 "Stathmopoda plumbiflua". InsectIn.com.

Moths described in 1911
Stathmopodidae